John Philip Goleby (22 March 1935 – 10 September 1985) was an Australian politician and farmer. A member of the National Party, he served in the Queensland Legislative Assembly for the electoral district of Redlands from 1974 until his death in 1985.

Early life and career
Goleby was born in Cleveland, Queensland, the son of Philip Eric Goleby and his wife Carolena Amelia (née Holzapfel), and lived in the area all his life. He was educated at Mount Cotton and Thornlands state schools before attending Wynnum High School and, after finishing his education, worked on the family farm at Thornlands. He later bought a property at Mount Cotton and continued his farming career.

Goleby was a councillor on the Redland Shire Council from 1961 until 1980, and during that time was chairman of the Finance and Works Committee from 1967 until 1975, and then chairman of the Works Committee from 1975 to 1978.

In 1974, Goleby successfully stood as the Country Party (National Party) candidate for the seat of Redlands and represented the electorate until his death in 1985. From 6 December 1982 until his death on 10 September 1985, he was the Minister for Water Resources and Maritime Services.

Personal life and death
Goleby married Margery Day on 14 April 1956. The couple had a son and a daughter. Margery died in 1979 and, in December 1980, he married Betty Lind. He was a member of the Uniting Church.

On 10 September 1985, Goleby, aged 50, died in a tractor accident at his Mount Cotton farm. He was accorded a state funeral, which proceeded from the Cleveland Uniting Church to the Cleveland Cemetery.

References

1935 births
1985 deaths
20th-century Australian politicians
Members of the Queensland Legislative Assembly
National Party of Australia members of the Parliament of Queensland
People from Redland City
Accidental deaths in Queensland
Farmers from Queensland